The 2016 NCAA Women's Gymnastics Championships were held April 15–16, 2016, at the Fort Worth Convention Center in Fort Worth, Texas. The 2016 edition marks the second consecutive time the Championship has been held in Fort Worth; this only the second time it has been held in the state of Texas. The team competition was won by Oklahoma with a score 197.675.

Qualification and selection process

Selection process 
The championship provides for a field of 36 teams determined based on their regional qualifying score and seeded by the NCAA Women’s Gymnastics Committee. Additionally, 24 all-around competitors and 48 individual event specialists (12 on each piece) are eligible to advance to Regionals – as long as they're on a non-qualifying team.

Regionals 
As a result, six NCAA Regional competitions – all of which contain 6 teams, 4 all-around competitors and 2 individual event specialists per event (8 in total) – took place on April 2, 2016. The selection show to announce the placements for teams and individuals will take place during the weekend of March 25–27, 2016.

Regional Championships

Tuscaloosa Regional 
The Tuscalooa Regional was held at the Coleman Coliseum, on the campus of the University of Alabama; it was hosted by the Alabama Crimson Tide gymnastics team. 1st - Alabama (197.125), 2nd - California (195.925), Boise State (195.750), Kentucky (195.725), West Virginia (194.250) and Bowling Green (193.850).

Minneapolis Regional 
The Minneapolis Regional was held at the University of Minnesota Sports Pavilion.  The Minnesota Golden Gophers women's gymnastics team hosted the Florida Gators, Denver Pioneers, Missouri Tigers, BYU Cougars and Ohio State Buckeyes. 1st - Florida (196.725), 2nd - Minnesota (196.175), Missouri (195.85), Denver (195.70), Ohio State (194.775) and Brigham Young (194.075).

Ann Arbor Regional 
The Ann Arbor Regional was held at the University of Michigan's Crisler Center.  The Michigan Wolverines women's gymnastics team hosted Eastern Michigan, Penn State, New Hampshire, Auburn, and Stanford. 1st - Auburn (196.525), 2nd - Stanford (196.525), Michigan (196.475), Eastern Michigan (196.250), Penn State (195.125), New Hampshire (193.900).

Athens Regional 
The Athens Regional was held at Stegeman Coliseum at the University of Georgia.  The Georgia Gym Dogs hosted LSU, Oregon State, Arizona, George Washington, and Michigan State. 1st - LSU (197.300), 2nd - Georgia (196.850), Oregon State (196.000), Arizona (195.900), George Washington (195.550) and Michigan State (195.350).

Salt Lake City Regional 
The Salt Lake City Regional was held at the University of Utah's Jon M. Huntsman Center.  The Utah Red Rocks hosted Utah State, Southern Utah, Illinois, UCLA, and Washington.  1st - Utah (197.125), 2nd - UCLA  (196.375), Washington (195.825), Illinois (195.350), Utah State (195.025), 
Southern Utah (194.950)

Iowa City Regional 
The Iowa City Regional will be held at Carver-Hawkeye Arena.  The Iowa Hawkeyes women's gymnastics team will host Oklahoma, Nebraska, Arkansas, Kent State, and Central Michigan. 1st - Oklahoma (197.575), 2nd - Nebraska (196.550), Arkansas (195.500), Iowa (195.450), Central Michigan (194.675) and Kent State (194.525).

NCAA Women's Gymnastics Championship
On April 15, 2016 top two finishers from the six regions competed to advance to the national team title meet on April 16, 2016. The top three finishers of each session form the Super Six Team.

 Afternoon session (1 p.m. CST) – Florida (197.475), LSU (197.3375), Georgia (196.725), Stanford (195.575), Auburn (195.100), Minnesota (194.9875) 
 Evening session (7 p.m. CST) – Oklahoma (197.7875), Alabama (197.3875), UCLA (196.700), Cal (195.850), Nebraska (195.775), Utah (195.7625)

NCAA Championship (Super Six Finals)
Super Six finals was held on April 16, 2016, at 8 p.m. CT and broadcast live on ESPNU.

 Team Championship - 1st Oklahoma (197.6750), 2nd LSU (197.4500), 3rd Alabama (197.4375), 4th Florida (197.3500), 5th UCLA 196.8250), 6th Georgia (196.8125)

Individual Event Finals

References 

NCAA Women's Gymnastics championship
2016 in American sports
2016 in sports in Texas
2016 in gymnastics
NCAA Women's Gymnastics Championship
Sports competitions in Fort Worth, Texas